Limbur is a village in the Fergana Region of Uzbekistan. It lies in the Sokh District, an exclave of Uzbekistan, surrounded by Kyrgyzstan. Nearby towns and villages include Sarykamysh and Bejey.

References 

Populated places in Fergana Region